Sunningdale Golf Club is a golf club in Sunningdale, Berkshire, England, located approximately  west-southwest of London.

Sunningdale Golf Club was founded in 1900 and has two eighteen hole golf courses: the Old Course, designed by Willie Park Jr., and the New Course, designed by Harry Colt, which opened in 1923.

Sunningdale has hosted many prestigious events in golf, including the British Masters, Walker Cup, Women's British Open, and The Senior Open Championship. From 2004 to 2013, Europe's International Final Qualifying tournament for The Open Championship was held over both the Old and New courses at Sunningdale. It hosted the Seniors Amateur Championship in 2017.

History
Sunningdale Golf Club was founded in 1900 on Chobham Common, on land owned by St. John's College, Cambridge. Its first Secretary was Harry Colt, who went on to design golf courses of international renown, such as the New Course at Sunningdale, Ealing, and Swinley Forest. Colt was highly influential in the creation of the Pine Valley Golf Club in New Jersey, widely acknowledged as one of the best golf courses in the world. The original 18-hole course, set in a heathland area, with sandy subsoil amid mixed treed foliage, was designed by Willie Park Jr., and was ready for play in 1901. It was also among the first successful courses located away from the seaside, as many people had thought at the time that turf would not grow well in such regions.

From the start, Sunningdale was well regarded and has hosted many important events. Examples include News of the World Match Play in 1903, 1907, 1912, and 1922; several stagings of the British Masters in the 1940s and 1950s; the 1974–79 Colgate European Open; the 1987 Walker Cup; the 1985, 1986, 1988, and 1992 European Open and the 1997, 2001, 2004, and 2008 Women's British Open. The Open Championship, International Final Qualifying has been held annually over the Old and New Courses since 2004. It was also the venue of the 2009 Senior British Open Championship, which was won by Loren Roberts. It hosted the Senior Open Championship again in July 2015, the winner being Marco Dawson. Bobby Jones had great fondness for Sunningdale. He scored 66-68 over it during qualifying for the 1926 British Open, with the 66 consisting of 33 full strokes and 33 putts, with every hole played in either 3 or 4; this has sometimes been described as the perfect round of golf. Jones said afterwards: "I wish I could take this course home with me." The original course is now called the Old Course, with the club having opened the New Course in 1923; it is also excellent and was designed by Harry Colt.

Colt was also the first secretary of Sunningdale, and recollections of his days at the club are described in Sheridan of Sunningdale, a unique history of the early years of Sunningdale, which was written in 1967 by Jimmy Sheridan, caddie master at Sunningdale for 56 years from 1910. The book is available on Kindle.

The club's first professional was Jack White, winner of the 1904 Open Championship, played at Royal St. George's. The course record on the Old Course is 62, jointly held by Nick Faldo at the 1986 European Open and Shane Lowry in the first round of Open Championship qualifying in 2010. Graeme Storm holds the course record on the New Course, a 62 recorded during the Open Championship, International Final Qualifying, Europe, 2009.

In the final round of the 2004 Women's British Open at Sunningdale (Old), eventual winner, English professional Karen Stupples began her round with an eagle followed by an albatross on the two opening par-5 holes. This score of five under par after only two holes is believed to be a world record at any level of competition.

Like many golf courses in Britain, Sunningdale is dog-friendly; canines are very welcome to accompany their owners on the course, provided they can conduct themselves reasonably. Halfway on the course is a refreshment hut known for its sausages and other victuals.

Tournaments

Senior Open Championship

Women's British Open

British Masters

Bolded years signify major championship

In popular culture

 The course is the site of the murder in "The Sunningdale Mystery", one of the short stories in Partners in Crime, a collection by Agatha Christie.
 James Bond and Bill Tanner play a round of golf on the New Course in the opening chapter of the 1968 James Bond continuation novel, Colonel Sun, written by Kingsley Amis under the pseudonym, "Robert Markham".

References

External links

ESPN video - Dogs welcome at Sunningdale

Golf clubs and courses in Berkshire
Sports venues completed in 1900
Walker Cup venues
1900 establishments in England